This is a list of transactions that have taken place during the off-season and the 2019–20 WNBL season.

Front office movements

Head coach changes
Off-season

Player movement

Free agency

Released

Going overseas

Retirement

See also
List of 2019–20 WNBL team rosters

References

Transactions